Mercenaries 2: World in Flames is an action-adventure video game developed by Pandemic Studios and published by Electronic Arts for PlayStation 2, PlayStation 3, Xbox 360 and Microsoft Windows. It is the sequel to 2005's Mercenaries: Playground of Destruction. The game is a third-person shooter with an open world, set in a fictionalized war-torn Venezuela. The game's primary objective is to kill the President of Venezuela whose betrayal of the protagonist mercenary acted as a stepping stone to their current position.

Following the closure of Pandemic Studios, EA announced in November 2009 that EA Los Angeles were working on a title known as Mercs Inc. The game was eventually canceled following the closure of Danger Close Games in 2013.

Plot 
Following the events of the Second Korean War, the Mercenary and their technical support advisor Fiona Taylor leave Executive Operations to work independently. Three years later, the Mercenary is referred to a contract in Venezuela by Blanco: a Liberian who the Mercenary had worked with in Dakar. Blanco introduces them to Ramon Solano - a billionaire software entrepreneur with family ties to drug trafficking. Using his connections, Solano had convinced General Carlos Carmona and large portions of the Venezuelan Army to overthrow the government. However, General Carmona had since been captured by loyalist army units - leading Solano to hire the Mercenary to rescue him.

Upon rescuing Carmona and returning him to Solano, however, the Mercenary is betrayed and Solano attempts to execute them, shooting them in the butt as they flee his mansion. Humiliated and penniless, the Mercenary watches as Solano overthrows the Venezuelan government in a coup d'état, then decides to take revenge and set up a PMC of their own.

Development
Pandemic Studios began developing early ideas of Mercenaries 2 in December 2005; an early pitched concept took place in the studio's home country of Australia, and featured robotic soldiers and a final boss that was secretly a cyborg.  This idea would later be reserved for the shelved Mercenaries 3: No Limits. To counter the "dark and gloomy" atmosphere of the first game, developing artists wanted to create a colorful environment and were immediately attracted to somewhere tropical. It was decided relatively early on for the game to be set in South America, with beta tests taking place in Argentina and Suriname until Venezuela was chosen due to its massive links to communism, history of internal conflicts, and its importance to the international oil industry. In addition to the three playable mercenaries from the first game, a fourth and fifth mercenary character were also considered; one planned mercenary included Fiona Taylor, a prominent character who appears in both games as a non-playable character.

Mercenaries 2 was notorious at the time for its constantly changing release dates. Its original launch date was December 2006, before being pushed back to Spring 2007, Winter 2007, Spring 2008, Summer 2008, and then to its final release date of September 2008. This was met with a very negative reaction from fans, especially when retailers such as Walmart and GameStop allowed preorders marked with a Winter 2007 release. Developers have since alluded that the game was released unfinished by EA Studios.

Marketing and release
In preparation for the release of Mercenaries 2, Electronic Arts opened a commercial campaign in August 2008, with scenes of the plot of the game in a stylized world, featuring background music reminiscent of a "hip-hop musical" singing about how the protagonists are going to get revenge for being double crossed and getting no pay to boot. The song, called "Oh No You Didn't" was written and performed by the Wojahn Brothers and was released as a single on September 23.

EA took over the Last Stop petrol station in Finsbury Park, North London, on the release day of the game in order to give away £20,000 worth of petrol for free, with each driver receiving a maximum of £40. The petrol station was transformed into a military bunker, with sandbags, oil barrels and jeeps. The area's member of parliament, Lynne Featherstone, described the campaign as an "ill thought-out media stunt" after it created unnecessary traffic congestion.

The demo of the game became available on September 18 on the PlayStation Network and Xbox Live.

Downloadable content
Pandemic Studios developed a free patch, called "Total Payback", which adds six new playable characters, cross-region co-op, and cheats. The patch was released on October 23 for PS3 and October 31 for 360 users.

The Mercenaries 2 DLC content pack "Blow It Up Again" was released for download on the PlayStation Store in December 12. An Xbox 360 version of DLC was expected to come soon after Sony's release, but DLC had relatively little advertising and failed to even have an official announcement from Pandemic aside from a simple trailer which was available for download on the Xbox Live Marketplace. It has also been raised from free to $1.99.

The "Total Payback" patch and "Blow It Up Again" content pack have not been released for the Windows version.

Reception

Mercenaries 2: World in Flames received "average" reviews on all platforms except the PlayStation 2 version, which received "generally unfavorable reviews", according to the review aggregation website Metacritic.

Though praised for its colorful and destructive environments, many reviews have complained of "nagging annoyances" throughout the game that occasionally feel rushed and unfinished. One of the major problems was the unintelligent AI of both friendly and enemy NPCs, and the issue was aggravated by voice acting and repetitive lines. Some reviewers found several gameplay mechanisms questionable, such as the air supports and airstrikes being of limited value, over-powerful melee attacks, and simplistic faction dynamics. The reactions from the new co-op mode were divided; while another player added to the fun, there were limitations, such as the tether between players and limited role of the passenger when in a vehicle. Edge gave the PlayStation 3 version a score of six out of ten and said that it "remains an absolute blast". In Japan, Famitsu gave it a score of one eight, one nine, and two sevens for the PlayStation 3 and Xbox 360 versions; and one six, one seven, and two fives for the PS2 version.

Mercenaries 2 was nominated for "Dubious Honors: Worst Game Everyone Played" by GameSpot in their 2008 video game awards, which was a category for games with large sales that had been panned by the critics. In addition, it won "Dubious Honors: Most Disappointing Game" by GameSpot.

Controversy and criticism
The game has been criticized by the Venezuelan government, accusing the U.S. government of trying to drum up support from the American public for a real-life invasion of Venezuela with the purpose of overthrowing Hugo Chávez. Pandemic Studios had previously developed training aids for the U.S. Army. In response to the criticism, the official website of the game included the following disclaimer:

References

External links
 
 
 

2008 video games
Action-adventure games
Cooperative video games
Electronic Arts games
World in Flames
Multiplayer and single-player video games
Obscenity controversies in video games
Open-world video games
Pandemic Studios games
PlayStation 2 games
PlayStation 3 games
Third-person shooters
Video game sequels
Video games developed in Canada
Video games set in 2010
Video games set in Venezuela
Video games set in South America
Windows games
Xbox 360 games
Video games using Havok
Behaviour Interactive games
Video games developed in the United States